Zhangbei County, in northwestern Hebei province, China, is a county formerly in the Chahar province. Zhangbei Town is the seat of the county government.

Administrative divisions

There are 4 towns and 14 townships under the county's administration.

Towns:
Zhangbei Town, Gonghui, Ertai, Dahulun

Townships:
Tailugou Township, Youlougou Township, Mantouying Township, Erquanjing Township, Danjinghe Township, Dahe Township, Hailiutu Township, Liangmianjing Township, Haojiaying Township, Baimiaotan Township, Xiao'ertai Township, Zhanhai Township, Sanhao Township, Huangshiya Township

Climate

Transportation
China National Highway 207

References

External links
Information of Zhangbei County

County-level divisions of Hebei
Zhangjiakou